Galaxy of Horrors is a 2017 Canadian science-fiction horror anthology film consisting of eight short films within larger "wraparound" framing sequences before and after each of the shorts, in which a man (Adam Buller) wakes from a cryogenic sleep pod and is forced to watch the films as entertainment while his life-support runs out. The shorts are by international filmmakers such as Antonio Padovan, Javier Chillon, Benni Diez and Marinko Spahić, while Justin McConnell directed the wraparound.

Plot

Untitled wraparound
Mr. Brown wakes up in deep space trapped in his cryogenic stasis pod. Unable to get out because of a faulty system asking him for a password, he is forced to wait and watch science fiction horror shorts chosen by the computer for his entertainment, even though this is draining the life support system. During the brief intermissions, he tries guessing the password again and again, with events taking a more and more dire turn.

Eden
In a future United States, a civil war has poisoned the air and very few people can survive for long without a gas mask. One of the factions manages to infiltrate a compound on the other side with the aim of assassinating the president and liberating one of their own who has a natural immunity to the air and is the victim of torture and experiments.

Iris
A man named Dave tries to hide a dead body, but his smartphone's AI, Iris, has developed a sense of ethics and justice, challenging his actions and finding ways to thwart him.

Flesh Computer
A weary handyman does his best to maintain order and care for his cybernetic "pet project", a strange mix of machine and flesh. But when a pair of thuggish residents threaten a young girl, the line between human and machine becomes blurred.

Pathos

A man is hooked up to a machine via a large tube attached to the top of his head; he pays for experiences, his senses, and life itself with increasing desperation as the computer system steadily blocks each of his senses after he has an unauthorized thought.

Eveless 

In a future world where women no longer exist, two men have desperately tried to conceive one themselves experimentally. One of them is in labour and neither is prepared for what is about to happen.

They Will All Die in Space

Two men wake a third from stasis in the hope he can fix their damaged ship, adrift in deep space. As he begins work, he realizes things are not quite what they seem.

Entity 

Minutes after the technical failure of her spacecraft, an astronaut finds herself ejected into space. She tries in vain to call for help. She is slowly running out of air. Little by little, fear grabs hold of her, and she faints. After floating adrift for several hours through the immensity of space, she awakens to find herself facing a strange and   sentient entity in the form of a nebula.

Kingz 

Two drug couriers go to an underground club to make a delivery but come up against something not of this world.

Production
The anthology film is the second collaboration between Rue Morgue Cinema and the Little Terrors short films festival, following Minutes Past Midnight. The feature is the brain-child of Little Terrors founder Justin McConnell, who wrote and directed the narrative links between the shorts, and Indiecan Entertainment's Avi Federgreen.

Release and reception
Galaxy of Horrors had a premiere in Toronto at Imagine Cinemas Carlton on 1 March 2017.

Home media and streaming
The Galaxy of Horrors anthology was released on DVD and special edition Blu-ray in 2017. The anthology was made available through various video on demand options on the IndieCan Entertainment website, on 7 March 2017, and on Amazon Prime.

Critical response
A number of reviewers found similarities in the film or individual segments with the Black Mirror series, usually as a point in the anthology's favour. Carl Fisher is impressed by the "seriously high production values", remarking that "some of the visuals ... are simply stunning".

Addison Wylie described the "claustrophobic wraparound short" by Justin McConnell as "semi-meta" and "pretty clever"; a bit of Mystery Science Theater 3000 dowsed in Heavy Metal: "The videos play for him – and for us – in a disjointed order;  a forgivable trait since Galaxy of Horrors basically throws the audience into immediate abruptness." Carl Fisher called its story "minimal but with a fun payoff." Karina Adelgaard appreciated the intermissions as "little nuggets of comedy" and a "welcome relief" since most of the shorts are very dark.

Sequel
The next film in the series compiled by Justin McConnell is Blood, Sweat, and Terrors (2018).

References

External links
Official trailer

Canadian horror anthology films
Canadian drama films
English-language Canadian films
Canadian science fiction horror films
2017 drama films
2010s science fiction horror films
2010s Canadian films